The 2000–01 English Hockey League season took place from September 2000 until April 2001.

The men's title was won by Reading with the women's title going to Leicester. There were no playoffs to determine champions after the regular season but there was a competition for the top four clubs called the Premiership tournament which culminated with men's & women's finals on 22 April. Surbiton won the men's Premiership tournament and Slough claimed the women's premiership tournament.

The Men's Cup was won by Guildford and the Women's Cup was won by Slough.

Men's Premier Division League Standings

Women's Premier Division League Standings

Men's Premiership Tournament

Women's Premiership Tournament

Men's Cup (EHA Cup)

Quarter-finals

Semi-finals

Final 
(Held at the National Hockey Stadium (Milton Keynes) on 25 March)

Women's Cup (EHA Cup)

Quarter-finals

Semi-finals

Final 
(Held at National Hockey Stadium (Milton Keynes) on 25 March)

References 

2000
field hockey
field hockey
2000 in field hockey
2001 in field hockey